Sickle grass is a common name for several plants and may refer to:

 Parapholis incurva, native to Europe, Asia, and northern Africa
 Pogonarthria squarrosa